Yuri Kostiantynovych Yeliseyev (born September 26, 1949, in Sverdlovsk, Luhansk Oblast) is a retired Soviet football player.

Honours
 Soviet Top League winner: 1972.
 Olympic bronze: 1972.

International career
Yeliseyev made his debut for USSR on June 29, 1972, in a friendly against Uruguay. He played at the 1972 Summer Olympics and scored one goal.

References

 Profile 

1949 births
Living people
People from Sverdlovsk
Soviet footballers
Ukrainian footballers
Soviet Union international footballers
FC Lokomotiv Moscow players
PFC Krylia Sovetov Samara players
FC Zorya Luhansk managers
Olympic medalists in football
FC Lokomotiv Kaluga players
Soviet Top League players
Association football forwards
Medalists at the 1972 Summer Olympics
Olympic bronze medalists for the Soviet Union
Ukrainian football managers
Sportspeople from Luhansk Oblast